Tornik may refer to:

Places 
 Tornik (peak), a mountain in Zlatibor, Serbia
 Tornik ski resort
 Tornik, Ljubovija, a village in Mačva District, Serbia

Other uses 
 Tornike, a Georgian masculine given name